Gary Indiana (b. 1950 as Gary Hoisington in Derry, New Hampshire) is an American writer, actor, artist, and cultural critic. He served as the art critic for the Village Voice weekly newspaper from 1985 to 1988. Indiana is best known for his classic American true-crime trilogy, Resentment, Three Month Fever: The Andrew Cunanan Story, and Depraved Indifference, chronicling the less permanent state of “depraved indifference” that characterized American life at the millennium's end. In the introduction to the recently re-published edition of Three Month Fever, critic Christopher Glazek has coined the phrase deflationary realism to describe Indiana's writing, in contrast to the magical realism or hysterical realism of other contemporary writing.

Plays
Indiana has written, directed and acted in a dozen plays, mostly during the early 1980s. Performed in small New York City venues like Mudd Club, Club 57, the Performing Garage and the backyard of Bill Rice's East 3rd Street studio. Earlier plays included Alligator Girls Go to College (1979); Curse of the Dog People (1980); A Coupla White Faggots Sitting Around Talking (1980), which was filmed by Michel Auder in 1981; The Roman Polanski Story (1981); Phantoms of Louisiana (1981) and Roy Cohn/Jack Smith (1992), written with Jack Smith for performance artist Ron Vawter. The latter was filmed in 1994 by Jill Godmilow.

A more recent play, Mrs. Watson's Missing Parts, was staged in May 2013 at Participant Inc. It drastically alters a 1922 Grand Guignol theatrical adaptation of Octave Mirbeau's novel The Torture Garden by replacing all dialogue with an "almost incomprehensible" obscenity-laden libidinal glossolalia.

Film
Indiana has acted in several mostly experimental films by, among others, Michel Auder (Seduction of Patrick, 1979, which he co-wrote with the director), Scott B and Beth B (The Trap Door, 1980), Melvie Arslanian (Stiletto, 1981, where he plays a bellhop at the bellhopless Chelsea Hotel), Jackie Raynal (Hotel New York, 1984), Ulrike Ottinger (1984, with Veruschka as Dorian Gray and Delphine Seyrig as Doctor Mabuse), Lothar Lambert (Fräulein Berlin, 1984), Dieter Schidor (Cold in Columbia, 1985), Valie Export (The Practice of Love, 1985) and Christoph Schlingensief (Terror 2000: Intensivstation Deutschland, 1994, in which Udo Kier kills his character with a machine gun). John Boskovich’s 2001 film North features Indiana reading from the Céline novel of the same name.

Indiana's novel Gone Tomorrow reflects his experiences on set, particularly his time working on Cold in Columbia.

Speaking of his acting style generally, Indiana told an interviewer, "I wasn't trained, and certainly didn't have the technique of a professional. Directors would cast me because of the way I was, not what I could pretend to be."

Art
Indiana's video Stanley Park (2013) was included in the 2014 Whitney Biennial. Combining footage of a former Cuban prison, the Panopticon-like Presidio Modelo, jellyfish and cuts from the films Touch of Evil and The Shanghai Gesture, the work connects the consequences of global environmental degradation with increasingly repressive governmental practices. Used as a metaphor for state surveillance, the jellyfish was described by Indiana as “an organism with no brain and a thousand poisonous tentacles collecting what you could call data.” Photographs of young Cuban men appeared next to the video.

Semiotext(e) published 22 pamphlets for the biennial, including Indiana's A Significant Loss of Human Life, which extends the video's themes by juxtaposing the artist's experiences of Cuba as it is slowly being drawn into the global economy with commentary on the ideas of Karl Marx.

In addition to Stanley Park, publicly screened video art by Indiana includes Soap (2004–2012), inspired by the Francis Ponge poem; Plutot la vie (2005), concerning the Society of the Spectacle and mass hypnosis; Unfinished Story (2004–2005), which records readings by and conversations between Indiana and photographer Lynn Davis; and Young Ginger (2014)

Bibliography

Fiction

 (1987) Scar Tissue and Other Stories 
 (1988) White Trash Boulevard 
 (1989) Horse Crazy 
 (1991) Disorderly Conduct: The VLS Fiction Reader (contributor) 
 (1993) Gone Tomorrow 
 (1994) Rent Boy 
 (1994) Living With the Animals (editor, contributor) 
 (1997) Resentment: A Comedy 
 (1999) Three Month Fever: The Andrew Cunanan Story 
 (2002) Depraved Indifference 
 (2003) Do Everything in the Dark 
 (2009) The Shanghai Gesture 
 (2010) Last Seen Entering the Biltmore: Plays, Short Fiction, Poems 1975–2010 
 (2011) To Whom It May Concern (limited edition artist's book with Louise Bourgeois) 
 (2016) Tiny Fish that Only Want to Kiss

Nonfiction

 (1987) Lucas Samaras: Chairs and Drawings (for Pace Gallery) 
 (1987) Roberto Juarez (for Robert Miller Gallery)
 (1989) Life Under Neon: Paintings and Drawings of Times Square 1981–1988 (Jane Dickson catalogue for Goldie Paley Gallery, Moore College of Art and Design; contributor) 
 (1996) Let It Bleed: Essays 1985–1995 
 (1996) Aura Rosenberg: Head Shots 
 (1997) Front Pages (Nancy Chunn catalogue for the Corcoran Gallery of Art; contributor) 
 (1997) Hunt Slonem: Exotica (for Colby College Museum of Art; contributor) 
 (1998) Christopher Wool (for the Los Angeles Museum of Contemporary Art; contributor) 
 (1999) Barbara Kruger: Thinking of You (for the Museum of Contemporary Art; contributor) 
 (2000) Valie Export: Ob/De+Con(Struction) (for Goldie Paley Gallery, Moore College of Art and Design; contributor) 
 (2000) BFI Film Classics: Salò or The 120 Days of Sodom  
 (2004) BFI Film Classics: Viridiana 
 (2004) John Waters: Change of Life (for the New Museum of Contemporary Art; contributor) 
 (2005) The Schwarzenegger Syndrome: Politics and Celebrity in the Age of Contempt 
 (2005) Kathe Burkhart: Bad Girl: Works from 1983–2000 
 (2005) Paul Kostabi 
 (2006) Cameron Jamie (contributor) 
 (2008) Utopia's Debris: Selected Essays 
 (2009) Paul Pfeiffer (contributor) 
 (2009) Chaos and Night by Henry de Montherlant (introduction to the NYRB Classics edition) 
 (2010) Dike Blair: Now and Again (for the Weatherspoon Art Museum; contributor) 
 (2010) Andy Warhol and the Can that Sold the World 
 (2010) Roni Horn: Well and Truly (for Kunsthaus Bregenz; contributor)   
 (2010) Coma by Pierre Guyotat (introduction to the Semiotext(e) edition) 
 (2011) Dead Flowers (monograph on Timothy Carey; contributor) 
 (2012) Bye Bye American Pie (for MALBA Fundación Costantini, Buenos Aires) 
 (2013) Damián Aquiles 
 (2014) Edgewise: A Picture of Cookie Mueller (contributor) 
 (2014) A Significant Loss of Human Life 
 (2015) Tracey Emin: Angel Without You (for the Museum of Contemporary Art North Miami; contributor) 
 (2015) I Can Give You Anything But Love 
 (2015) Tal R: Altstadt Girl (for Cheim & Read) 
 (2017) Roni Horn (contributor) 
 (2018) Ivory Pearl by Jean-Patrick Manchette (afterword for the NYRB Classics edition) 
 (2018) Vile Days: The Village Voice Art Columns, 1985–1988

Critical studies and essays on Indiana's work
 (1992) Shopping in Space: Essays on American "Blank Generation" Fiction by Elizabeth Young, Graham Caveney 
 (1998) Blank Fictions: Consumerism, Culture and the Contemporary American Novel by James Annesley 
 
  (subscription required)
 Christopher Glazek (Winter 2016). "Cunanan/Bovary". Semiotext(e)/Native Agents. 

Sarah Nicole Prickket (October 4, 2018). "The Dry-Eyed Mourning of Gary Indiana." LitHub.

Paul McAdory (April 28, 2022). "Gary Indiana Hates in Order to Love." Gawker.
Harry Tafoya (February 20, 2023). "Down There: A Review of Rent Boy by Gary Indiana." Substack.

References

External links
 The Gary Indiana Papers at Fales Library, New York University
 Gary Indiana at IMDb 
 Gary Indiana's articles for Vice
 "Diaries 1989–90 by Gary Indiana" in BOMB Magazine, Issue 34; January 1, 1990
 "Rent Boy by Gary Indiana", an excerpt carried in BOMB Magazine, Issue 46; January 1, 1994
 "Resentment: A Comedy by Gary Indiana", an excerpt carried in BOMB Magazine, Issue 60; July 1, 1997
 "Ackerville", Indiana's posthumous profile of Kathy Acker in The London Review of Books, Vol. 28 No. 24; 14 December 14, 2006
 "Diary: In Havana", an article by Indiana in The London Review of Books, Vol. 35 No. 10; May 23, 2013
 "Gizmo", a story by Indiana in Sensitive Skin, Issue 10; September 2013
 "I Can Give You Anything but Love: A Memoir by Gary Indiana", an excerpt carried in BOMB Magazine, Issue 127; April 1, 2014
 "This is Cannibal Island Now", an interview with Indiana in Flash Art, Issue 297; July, August, September 2014
 "Unhappy Thoughts: Gary Indiana Gets Personal In New Memoir", a review of I Can Give You Anything but Love in ARTnews; September 15, 2015 
 "Writer Gary Indiana on his new memoir, Susan Sontag and why he hates the '80s", an interview with Indiana in The Los Angeles Times; October 8, 2015
 "Interview with Gary Indiana" in The White Review, Issue 16; April 2016
 "The Book Jean-Patrick Manchette Didn’t Live to Finish", an excerpt from Indiana's introduction to Ivory Pearl by Jean-Patrick Manchette (NYRB Classics); The Paris Review; April 23, 2018
 The Art of Fiction (250) Interview with Gary Indiana, The Paris Review, Winter 2021

20th-century American novelists
American art critics
1950 births
Living people
21st-century American novelists
American film critics
American male novelists
American LGBT novelists
American gay writers
The Village Voice people
20th-century American male writers
21st-century American male writers
Novelists from New York (state)
20th-century American non-fiction writers
21st-century American non-fiction writers
American male non-fiction writers